This is a list of current prime ministers of the world's sovereign states by the date they took office, from the earliest to the latest.

List of current prime ministers

References

See also
 List of current state leaders by date of assumption of office

Date of assumption of office
Prime ministers
Lists of heads of government